The 2015–16 Jordan FA Cup was the 36th season of Jordan FA Cup since its establishment in 1980. It started on 4 September 2015 and ended on 6 May 2016. Al-Wehdat were the defending champions, but they were eliminated in the round of 16. The winner of the competition will earn a spot in the 2017 AFC Cup.

Al-Ahli won their first title after beating Shabab Al-Ordon.

Participating teams
A total of 26 teams participated in this season, 12 teams of Premier league, 14 teams of Division 1.

Bracket

Preliminary rounds
A total of 14 teams from Division 1 played in the preliminary round.

|-
!colspan=3|Preliminary round #1

|-
!colspan=3|Preliminary round #2

|}

Note:     H: Home team,   A: Away team

source:

References

Jordan FA Cup seasons
FA Cup
Jordan